Woodrow Stanley (June 12, 1950 – February 15, 2022) was an American Democratic Party politician. He was mayor of Flint, Michigan from 1991 until his recall in 2002, and was a member of the Michigan House of Representatives from District 34 from 2009 to 2014.

Early life 
Stanley was born in Schlater, Mississippi, on June 12, 1950. He attended and graduated from Mott Community College. He then attended University of Michigan-Flint earning a bachelor's degree in political science. At University of Michigan-Flint, he had done additional course work towards a Masters of Public  Administration.

Political career 
In 1983, Stanley was appointed to the Flint City Council representing the 2nd ward being reelected until his election to the office of Mayor of the City of Flint defeating the incumbent Matthew S. Collier.  Stanley was elected to three terms as Mayor defeating (in order) future mayor Don Williamson (1995) and City Councilor Scott Kincaid (1999).   He was recalled in 2002 due to the city's shaky financial condition and a state appointed Financial Manager was appointed after he left office.  In  2004, Stanley was elected to the Genesee County Board of Commissioners, 2nd District.  In his second term as Commissioner, Stanley was selected to be chairman of the Board of Commissioners.
In November 2008, Stanley was elected to the Michigan House of Representatives from the 34th District.

Personal life and death 
Stanley died at Hurley Medical Center in Flint on February 15, 2022, at the age of 71.

Electoral history 
Mayoral Elections Results

State Representative Election Results

References 

1950 births
2022 deaths
20th-century American politicians
21st-century American politicians
African-American mayors in Michigan
African-American state legislators in Michigan
Methodists from Michigan
County commissioners in Michigan
Mayors of Flint, Michigan
Democratic Party members of the Michigan House of Representatives
Michigan city council members
People from Leflore County, Mississippi
Recalled American mayors
University of Michigan–Flint alumni